Juil Natim is a Malaysian politician from KDM. He has been the Member of Sabah State Legislative Assembly for Limbahau since 2020.

Politics 
In 2021, he quitted WARISAN and became an independent together with Peter Anthony. Then, in 2022, he joined KDM which is founded by Peter Anthony. He is currently the Deputy President for KDM.

Election result

References 

21st-century Malaysian politicians
Place of birth missing (living people)
Independent politicians in Malaysia
Sabah Heritage Party politicians
Members of the Sabah State Legislative Assembly
Living people
Year of birth missing (living people)